Srđan Bajčetić (born 7 November 1971) is a Serbian former professional footballer who played as a midfielder and the current manager of Celta C - Gran Peña. During his career he played with FK Vojvodina, Celta de Vigo, Red Star Belgrade, S.C. Braga, Dalian Shide and Hunan Shoking.

Personal life
His son, Stefan Bajcetic, plays for Liverpool F.C., having signed for the club in December 2020.

Honours
Dalian Shide
Chinese Jia-A League: 2001, 2002
Chinese FA Cup: 2001

References

External links
 Stats from Spain at LFP
  Profile at Sports.sina.com.cn

1971 births
Living people
Sportspeople from Zrenjanin
Serbian footballers
Association football midfielders
FK Vojvodina players
RC Celta de Vigo players
Red Star Belgrade footballers
S.C. Braga players
Dalian Shide F.C. players
La Liga players
Primeira Liga players
Serbian expatriate footballers
Serbian expatriate sportspeople in Spain
Expatriate footballers in Spain
Serbian expatriate sportspeople in Portugal
Expatriate footballers in Portugal
Serbian expatriate sportspeople in China
Expatriate footballers in China